Óscar Husillos Domingo (born 18 July 1993) is a Spanish sprinter specialising in the 200 and 400 metres. He won the gold medal in the 400 m at the 2021 European Indoor Championships and a silver at the 2019 European Indoor Championships.

Husillos is the Spanish indoor record holder for the 200 m, 300 m and 400 m. He won multiple national titles both outdoors and indoors.

Achievements

International competitions

1Disqualified in the final

Personal bests
 200 metres – 20.74 (+0.3 m/s, Guadalajara 2018)
 200 metres indoor – 20.68 (Valencia 2018) 
 300 metres – 33.00 (Palencia 2018)
 300 metres indoor – 32.39 (Salamanca 2018) 
 400 metres – 44.73 (Madrid 2018)
 400 metres indoor – 45.58 (Madrid 2023)

National titles
 Spanish Athletics Championships
 200 metres: 2016
 400 metres: 2017, 2018, 2019, 2021, 2022
 4 × 400 m relay: 2017
 Spanish Indoor Athletics Championships
 200 metres: 2014, 2016, 2018
 400 metres: 2017, 2019, 2021, 2023

References

External links

 
 
 
 

1993 births
Living people
Spanish male sprinters
People from Palencia
Sportspeople from the Province of Palencia
World Athletics Championships athletes for Spain
European Championships (multi-sport event) bronze medalists
European Athletics Championships medalists
Spanish Athletics Championships winners
European Athletics Indoor Championships winners
Athletes (track and field) at the 2020 Summer Olympics
Olympic athletes of Spain